was a private university in Dazaifu, Fukuoka, Japan. The school was founded in 2002 and adopted the present name in 2008. It closed in 2017.

External links
  

Educational institutions established in 2002
Universities and colleges in Fukuoka Prefecture
Buildings and structures in Dazaifu, Fukuoka
2002 establishments in Japan
Defunct private universities and colleges in Japan